The Building at 500 White Avenue, in Aztec, New Mexico, was built in 1908.  It was listed on the National Register of Historic Places in 1985.

It is a clapboarded wood-frame house built upon a stone foundation.  It has modest elements of Queen Anne style in its decorative wood shingles (alternating in pointed and hexagonal shapes) and its lathe-turned narrow porch columns with cutout brackets.  It has a "wood shingled window bay [which] is yet another attempt to add variety and distinction with
limited means."

References

National Register of Historic Places in San Juan County, New Mexico
Queen Anne architecture in New Mexico
Buildings and structures completed in 1908